The 2018–19 College of Charleston Cougars women's basketball team represents the College of Charleston during the 2018–19 NCAA Division I women's basketball season. The Cougars, led by fifth year head coach Candice M. Jackson, play their home games at the TD Arena and were members of the Colonial Athletic Association. They finished the season 7–23, 3–15 in CAA play to finish in a tie for last place. They lost in the first round of the CAA women's tournament to William & Mary.

On March 14, Jackson's contract was not renewed. She finished at Charleston with a record 5 year record of 39–103. The Cougars hired Lamar head coach Harmony for the same position on April 19.

Roster

Schedule

|-
!colspan=9 style=| Exhibition

|-
!colspan=9 style=| Non-conference regular season

|-
!colspan=9 style=| CAA regular season

|-
!colspan=9 style=| CAA Women's Tournament

See also
2018–19 College of Charleston Cougars men's basketball team

References

College of Charleston Cougars women's basketball seasons
College Of Charleston